2016 Golden Movie Awards is an annual award that celebrates outstanding achievement in African television and film. The event took place on Saturday June 25, 2016, at the Kempiski Hotel. It was hosted by DKB and Anita Erskine of EIB network.

References

Golden Movie Awards